Gertrud Leutenegger (born 1948) is a German-speaking Swiss poet, novelist, playwright and theatre director.

Life 
Gertrud Leutenegger was born and grew up in Schwyz, Switzerland, where her father was a book editor. She later lived in both the Italian-speaking and French-speaking parts of Switzerland. After completing her secondary education she initially undertook teacher training and became a Kindergarten teacher. She also worked in a psychiatric clinic for a time and was as a custodian at the Nietzsche House in Sils Maria.

Leutenegger's interest in theatre led to drama studies at the Zürich University of the Arts from 1976 to 1979 where she studied director's theatre (Regietheater). She worked as assistant producer to Jürgen Flimm, a noted exponent of Regietheater, at the Deutsches Schauspielhaus, Hamburg, in 1978. In the same year, she was awarded the prestigious Jury Prize of the Ingeborg Bachmann Prize for her early literary work. Many other prizes and distinctions followed.

After short spells in Florence and Berlin, Leutenegger lived for a long time in Japan. She now lives in Zürich. In 2010 she was elected to the German Academy for Language and Literature in Darmstadt.

Work 
Leutenegger first came to prominence as a poet, later bringing her poetic vision to her novels, the first of which, Vorabend, was published in 1975. Her work is noted for its subjective vision, use of myth and fairy tale, dreams and poetry. There is also a strong element of political engagement, for example in the 1985 novel Kontinent which deals with issues of environmental damage.

Leutenegger's most recently published work was the novel Panischer Frühling. This tells the story of a woman stranded in London when the eruption of the Icelandic volcano Eyjafjallajökull in 2010 brought all air-traffic to a sudden halt. This was shortlisted for both the Swiss Book Prize and the German Book Prize in 2014 and was awarded the Roswitha Prize in the same year.

Selected awards 
 1978 Jury Prize of the Ingeborg Bachmann Prize
 1979 Droste-Preis
 1986 Schweizerischen Schillerstiftung Prize
 1999 Innerschweizer Kulturpreis
 2009 Schillerpreis der Zürcher Kantonalbank: for Matutin
 2014 Shortlisted for the Swiss Book Prize: for Panischer Frühling
 2014 Shortlisted for the German Book Prize for Panischer Frühling
 2014 Roswitha-Preis awarded by the town of Bad Gandersheim for Panischer Frühling

Works

Literature

References 

1948 births
Living people
Swiss writers in German
Swiss theatre directors
21st-century Swiss poets
Swiss poets in German
Swiss women novelists
20th-century Swiss novelists
21st-century Swiss novelists
20th-century Swiss poets
People from the canton of Schwyz
Swiss women poets
20th-century Swiss women writers
21st-century Swiss women writers